The Medem is a river of Lower Saxony, Germany. It is a left tributary of the Elbe, into which it flows near Otterndorf.

See also
List of rivers of Lower Saxony

References

Rivers of Lower Saxony
Rivers of Germany